Thomas Circle Singers (TCS) is an independent chamber chorus located in Washington, D.C. It donates concert ticket proceeds to nonprofit organizations. TCS has raised over $100,000 for various Washington D.C.-based charitable causes, including Thrive DC, the Wendt Center for Loss and Healing, and Calvary Women's Services.

The group was founded in 1976 with the support of Luther Place Memorial Church, and is currently located at National City Christian Church on Thomas Circle in Washington, D.C. TCS was named Washingtonian of the Year 2000 by Washingtonian Magazine and artistic director James Kreger was honored in 2001 with WETA-FM’s Hometown Hero award.

References

External links
Thomas Circle Singers

American choirs
Musical groups from Washington, D.C.
Musical groups established in 1976
1976 establishments in Washington, D.C.